Tonette Lopez (died April 25, 2006) was the first transgender woman activist in the Philippines and a popular Asian LGBT activist, HIV/AIDS researcher and journalist.

Lopez led the 16th International AIDS Conference in 2005.

Gahum Philippines 
In 2001, Lopez started the Gay Human Rights Movement (GAHUM), based in Cebu City.

Lopez has stated: "Discrimination is very eminent. A country such ours, which is predominantly Roman Catholic is very difficult. Opinions and decisions are always coiled and intertwined with one's religiosity, belief and faith."

See also
LGBT rights in the Philippines

References 

http://www.tsphilippines.com/tonette.htm 
http://www.worldbank.org/wbi/smmt-2/lopez2.html
https://web.archive.org/web/20090525033526/http://progay.multiply.com/journal
 http://www.tsphilippines.com/transgenderrights.htm

External links 
http://apnsw.org/r/lopez.htm 

Filipino transgender people
Filipino LGBT rights activists
Filipino activists
People from Tacloban
Year of birth missing
2006 deaths
Transgender women
People from Eastern Samar